Juan Carlos Oliva Fornos (born 4 January 1965) is a Spanish football manager.

Football career
Born in Mequinenza, Province of Zaragoza, Aragon, Oliva started coaching at an early age, his beginnings being in amateur football. In 2005 he arrived at Deportivo Alavés, being first assigned to the reserves in the third division.

In early 2006, Oliva was appointed at the first team following the sacking of Chuchi Cos, being in charge for five games – three wins, one draw and only one loss, against FC Barcelona – before being dismissed himself by eccentric club chairman Dmitry Piterman. Alavés would finally suffer relegation from La Liga.

Returned to the third level with CE L'Hospitalet, Oliva led the Catalans to the fourth position in the regular season and the subsequent promotion playoffs, which ended without success. After a few months in Greece with Aris Thessaloniki FC, he returned to his country and its division three, being one of three managers for Villarreal CF B as the Valencian side finished in midtable.

Oliva returned to the top flight in 2008–09, acting as assistant for Manolo Zambrano's successor Lucas Alcaraz as Recreativo de Huelva finally ranked in the 20th and last position. In late January 2010 he was fired by UD Salamanca, but the Castile and León club finally managed to stay afloat in the second tier.

On 6 December 2010, Oliva joined Gimnàstic de Tarragona of the second division, replacing the dismissed Luis César Sampedro as the team ranked in last position. He managed to finally lead them out of the relegation zone, notably with a 3–1 home win against eventual champions Real Betis on 15 May 2011. 

After 11 matches without one win in 2011–12, Oliva was relieved of his duties at Nàstic. Subsequently, he had a series of spells as assistant manager under Quique Sánchez Flores.

On 18 June 2018, Oliva was appointed at Cypriot club AC Omonia. On 22 October, after three consecutive league defeats, he was sacked.

On 5 February 2019, Oliva joined Lleida Esportiu. He left by mutual consent in June, after failing in his objective of reaching the play-offs. 

On 10 September 2019, Oliva was named in Sánchez Flores's staff at Watford.

Managerial statistics

References

External links

Nàstic Grana profile 

1965 births
Living people
People from Bajo Cinca
Sportspeople from the Province of Huesca
Spanish football managers
La Liga managers
Segunda División managers
Segunda División B managers
CD Binéfar managers
UD Barbastro managers
Deportivo Alavés managers
CE L'Hospitalet managers
Villarreal CF B managers
UD Salamanca managers
Gimnàstic de Tarragona managers
Lleida Esportiu managers
Super League Greece managers
Aris Thessaloniki F.C. managers
Cypriot First Division managers
AC Omonia managers
Spanish expatriate football managers
Expatriate football managers in Greece
Expatriate football managers in Cyprus
Watford F.C. non-playing staff
Spanish expatriate sportspeople in Greece
Spanish expatriate sportspeople in Cyprus
Spanish expatriate sportspeople in England